Dundee West may mean or refer to:

 Dundee West (UK Parliament constituency)
 Dundee West (Scottish Parliament constituency)
 Dundee West railway station